Sri Venkateswara Ramnarain Ruia Government General Hospital (also Ruia Hospital) is a hospital in the pilgrim city of Tirupati, Andhra Pradesh, India. It is the largest public hospital in Rayalaseema region of Andhra Pradesh. It had 1500 beds, 27 operation theatres, 25 ICUs, and 10 specialties. It serves majorly four districts of Rayalaseema(Chittoor, Kadapa), Nellore and districts of Andhra Pradesh.
It is started in the year 1962 with a donation of Rs.5 lakhs from Sri Radha Krishna N. Ruia and 15 lakhs from Tirumala Tirupati Devasthanams.

References

Buildings and structures in Tirupati
Hospitals in Andhra Pradesh
Hospitals established in 1962
1962 establishments in Andhra Pradesh